Global Indian International School (GIIS) is a Singapore-based international school established in 2002.

History 
GIIS' first campus at Cheviot Hill was established by Global Schools Foundation in 2002 with just 48 students with the aim of providing education to the expatriate community in Singapore. The school has since expanded across South East Asia, Japan, Middle East and India.

Campuses 
GIIS has two campuses in Singapore, one at Cheviot Hill, the East Coast campus, and another at Punggol, SMART Campus.

Besides that, it has presence in over seven countries and 23 campuses which include those in Singapore, Malaysia (Kuala Lumpur), India (Hyderabad, Pune, Ahmedabad, Noida, and Bangalore), UAE (Abu Dhabi and Dubai), Thailand (Bangkok), Vietnam (Ho Chi Minh City) and Japan (Tokyo).

Curriculum 
Educational programs offered by GIIS include:

 Global Montessori Plus (GMP) Programme
 Central Board of Secondary Education (CBSE)
 International Baccalaureate Primary Years Programme (IB PYP) (In Singapore and Tokyo)
 Cambridge Lower Secondary Programme (CLSP) (In Singapore, Tokyo and Kuala Lumpur) 
 Cambridge's International General Certificate of Secondary Education (IGCSE) (In Singapore, Kuala Lumpur)
 International Baccalaureate Diploma Programme (IBDP) (In Singapore, Tokyo)

See also
 Global Indian International School, Tokyo Campus

References

External links

Indian international schools in Singapore
Educational institutions established in 2002